Katigar (also Romanized as Katīgar; also known as Kangar and Katkar) is a village in Lakan Rural District, in the Central District of Rasht County, Gilan Province, Iran. At the 2006 census, its population was 2,039, in 569 families.

References 

Populated places in Rasht County